Usollag, full name: Usolye Corrective Labor Camp  was a Gulag forced labor camp established on February 5, 1938 and functioned after the dissolution of Gulag, until 1960. It was headquartered in Solikamsk, now in Perm Krai, Russia, and it had numerous "lagpunkts" (individual camp locations) in the northern parts of the then Molotov Oblast. Its main occupation was logging and associated industries.  Its reported peak occupancy was 37,000 inmates on January 1, 1942. 

Its name is related to old name  Usolye Kamskoye of Solikamsk and is not to be confused with  ИТЛ  Усольгидролес (Usolgidroles ITL) sometimes referred to as  Usolye Corrective Labor Camp as well, but it was headquartered at the town of Usolye. Its name meaning:gidro-=hydro- standing for  + 'les' standing for "лесозаготовки", i.e., "logging", i.e. logging for Stalingrad hydropower plant construction works (now known as the Volga Hydroelectric Station).

A significant number of the residents of Usollag were the Labor army "worker columns" formed from the mobilized Volga Germans.

In 1941 the subcamp at the settlement of Surmog received a considerable number of inmates deported from the Baltic states incorporated into the Soviet Union.

Usollag administered several dozens of subcamps, called lagpunkts ("camp points"). Most of them housed about 100 inmates each doing logging. The only penal settlements of Sim and Surmog survived, which were converted into corrective labor colonies. Other settlements with disappeared subcamps of Usollag include Сом, Талая, Усть-Талка, Цыбин Родник;   Шомыш, Цветково, Ржавец, Талица, Красный Яр, Vilva, Мысья, Родники.

In 2013 the 75th anniversary of the establishment of Usollag was celebrated by the veterans of Perm division of Federal Penitentiary Service of Russia, including an official announcement and a festive concert.

Notable inmates

Estonians
August Ehrlich (1893-1942), Estonian politician
August Gustavson (1884-1942), Estonian politician
Nigul Kaliste (1894-1941), Estonian politician
Aleksander Oinas (1887-1942), Estonian politician, M.P.
Karl-Eduard Pajos (1894-1953), Estonian politician
Johannes Perens (1906-1941), Estonian politician
Nikolai Reek (1890-1942),  Estonian military commander
Aleksander Rei (1900–1943), Estonian politician
Jaan Soots (1880-1942),   Estonian military commander and politician
Järvo Tandre (1899-19431), Estonian politician
Artur Toom (1884-1942), Estonian ornithologist and conservationist 
Artur Tupits (1892-1941), Estonian politician
Richard Veermaa (1901-1942), Estonian politician
Mathias Westerblom (1888-1942), Estonian politician

Latvians
 (1884-1943),  Lutheran pastor, Minister of Education of the Republic of Latvia 
Emīlija Benjamiņa (1881-1941),  Latvian businesswoman and publisher
Krišjānis Berķis (1884-1942), Latvian general, Minister of War
 (1888-1942), Latvian social activist, man of letters, founder of the first Latvian news agency LETA
Alfrēds Birznieks (1889-1942), Latvian politician and lawyer
 (1883-1941), Latvian general and state official
 (1888-1942), Latvian judge, member of the Supreme Court ("Senate") of Latvia
 (1878-1942)  Latvian civil engineer and statesman
 (1875-1941) Latvian teacher and businessman
Frīdrihs Vesmanis (1875-1941), Latvian lawyer and politician 
 (1889-1941), Latvian aviator

Other
Rudolf Hamburger, German architect
Kuksha of Odessa (1875-1964), Ukrainian Orthodox Church (Moscow Patriarchate) saint, canonized in 1995
Lev Razgon (1908-1999), Soviet writer and human rights activist 
Heinrich Alexander Stoll, German writer
Mikhail Tanich (1923-2008), Russian song lyrics writer
 (1906-1996), German and Soviet architect

References

Camps of the Gulag
Perm Krai